The 1916–17 Army Cadets men's ice hockey season was the 14th season of play for the program.

Season
For Frank Purdon's final season behind the bench, Army almost tripled the number of games on its schedule. The team benefited from having an artificial ice rink for both practices and games for the first time, enabling the Cadets to finish with a winning record, defeating four other colleges along the way.

Roster

Standings

Schedule and Results

|-
!colspan=12 style=";" | Regular Season

References

Army Black Knights men's ice hockey seasons
Army
Army
Army
Army